The 1985 Champ Car season may refer to:
 the 1984–85 USAC Championship Car season, which was just one race, the 69th Indianapolis 500
 the 1985 CART PPG Indy Car World Series, sanctioned by CART, who later became Champ Car